The 2005–06 Macedonian Second Football League was the fourteenth season since its establishment. It began on 6 August 2005 and ended on 20 May 2006.

Participating teams

League table

Results
Every team will play three times against each other team for a total of 33 matches. The first 22 matchdays will consist of a regular double round-robin schedule. The league standings at this point will then be used to determine the games for the last 11 matchdays.

Matches 1–22

Matches 23–33

Promotion playoff

Relegation playoff

See also
2005–06 Macedonian Football Cup
2005–06 Macedonian First Football League

References

External links
Football Federation of Macedonia 
MacedonianFootball.com 

Macedonia 2
2
Macedonian Second Football League seasons